The men's triple jump at the 2012 European Athletics Championships was held at the Helsinki Olympic Stadium on 28 and 30 June.

Medalists

Records

Schedule

Results

Qualification
Qualification: Qualification Performance 16.75 (Q) or at least 12 best performers advance to the final

Final

Note: w = wind-assisted

References

External links
Qualification Results
Final Results

Triple jump
Triple jump at the European Athletics Championships